Millington is a surname. Notable people with the surname include:

Abel Millington (1787–1838), American politician
Ernest Millington (1916–2009), British politician
Grenville Millington (born 1951), Chester City footballer
June Millington (born 1948), Filipino-American guitarist, songwriter, producer, educator, and actress
Lucy Millington (1825–1900), American botanist
Margaret Millington (1944–1973), English-born mathematician
Mary Millington (1945–1979), British porn star
Mil Millington, British author
Richard Millington, British ornithologist
Ross Millington (born 1989), British long-distance runner
Sir Thomas Millington (1628–1704), English physician
Tony Millington (1943–2015), Welsh footballer

English-language surnames